Alma (Jawi: ألما) is a suburb in Bukit Mertajam, Penang, Malaysia. The AEON Mall Bukit Mertajam is located here and started operations in 2014.

References

Bukit Mertajam